Washington Declaration may refer to:

 Czechoslovak Declaration of Independence or Washington Declaration (1918), declaration proclaiming the First Czechoslovak Republic
 Washington Principles on Nazi-Confiscated Art or Washington Declaration (1998), statement concerning the restitution of art confiscated by the Nazi regime during World War II
 1994 declaration that paved the way for the Israel–Jordan Treaty of Peace
 An agreement announced at the 2008 G20 Washington summit regarding objectives to strengthen economic growth and deal with financial crisis

See also 
 Washington (disambiguation)
 Declaration (disambiguation)
 Washington Agreement (disambiguation)
 Washington Convention or CITES, a multilateral treaty to protect endangered plants and animals
 An Evangelical Manifesto, 2008 document subtitled The Washington Declaration of Evangelical Identity and Public Commitment
 Timeline of the Joe Biden presidency (2021 Q3) for a July 15 conference with German Chancellor Angela Merkel